Andrew Johnston (born 14 August 1970) is a former Australian rules footballer who played with Fitzroy in the Australian Football League (AFL). He was a Development Coach at the Gold Coast Football Club. He was the coach in the TAC Cup for Calder Cannon under 18 for 3 years ( 15 - 17 ). Johnston coached at St. Bernards football club in the VAFA as an assistant for a brief period of time before departing from the club at the end of 2019.

Originally from St. Bernards, Johnston played under-19s and reserves football with Essendon, prior to joining Fitzroy via the 1990 Pre-Season Draft. He played six senior games in 1990 and a further three in 1991.

References

External links
 
 

1970 births
Australian rules footballers from Victoria (Australia)
Fitzroy Football Club players
Living people